Ayushmann Khurrana (born 14 September 1984) is an Indian actor, poet, singer, and television host. He has established a career in Hindi cinema and is the recipient of several awards, including a National Film Award and four Filmfare Awards.

Khurrana won the second season of  reality television show MTV Roadies in 2004 and ventured into an anchoring career. He made his film debut in 2012 with the romantic comedy Vicky Donor. His performance earned him several accolades including the Filmfare Award for Best Male Debut. Following a brief setback, he starred in the commercially and critically successful romance Dum Laga Ke Haisha. Khurrana went on to establish himself with the comedies Bareilly Ki Barfi (2017), Shubh Mangal Saavdhan (2017), and Badhaai Ho (2018), and the thriller Andhadhun (2018).

In addition to acting, Khurrana has sung for all his films, including the song "Pani Da Rang", which earned him the Filmfare Award for Best Male Playback Singer.

Awards and nominations

See also
 List of Ayushmann Khurrana performances

References

External links
 

Lists of awards received by Indian actor